Wat Ang Kaeo is a Buddhist temple in Bangkok, Thailand. It is in a bottom of  narrow soi (lane) opposite Siam University, the temple situated by a Khlong Phasi Charoen.

Its name "Ang Kaeo" means "crystal bowl" owing to the location that is like being in a basin. Wat Ang Kaeo is an ancient temple that is assumed to have existed since the Ayutthaya period and was restored in the Rattanakosin period around reign of King Rama III or in the reign of King Rama V. It is regarded as the only temple in Bangkok that has a sand terrace. Used  for the ceremony create sand pagodas during the Songkran festival (13-15 April) annually.

Although it is only a small temple, but inside the ubosot (main hall) there are the beautiful mural paintings. The principle Buddha image  in the attitude of meditation was built in the Rattanakosin period. Upper part of the walls depicts Lord Buddha's life, behind the principle Buddha image shows Lord Buddha visiting his late mother in heaven. Right opposite the Buddha image depicts Lord Buddha facing Mara (demon), it was a classic one. Here, Buddha image is in meditation attitude while others are depicted in subduing Mara.

Between windows, there were paintings depicting the ten great past lives of the Lord Buddha. Lower part of the hall walls near the floor are paintings depicting various old Thai idioms, such as "Ping pla prachot maeo" (ปิ้งปลาประชดแมว, "BBQ fish in front of a cat"), and "Sao sai hai ka kin" (สาวไส้ให้กากิน, "bring guts out for crows") etc. Regarded as the only one in Thailand.

References

Buddhist temples in Bangkok
Phasi Charoen district
Registered ancient monuments in Bangkok